The Acheron class (re-named the I class in October 1913) was a class of twenty-three destroyers of the British Royal Navy, all built under the 1910–11 Programme and completed between 1911 and 1912, which served during the First World War.  A further six ships were built to the same design for the Royal Australian Navy as River-class destroyers. There was considerable variation between the design and construction of ships within this class, which should be considered as more of a post-build grouping than a homogeneous class.

Design
Originally, 20 ships, including Acheron, were ordered but three more were completed by Yarrow & Company. Three River-class destroyers of the Royal Australian Navy were laid down in British yards, with another three built in Australia. The Acherons were generally repeats of the preceding Acorn- or H-class, although Acheron and five others were builders' specials. They differed from the Acorns in having only two funnels, both of which were short, the foremost being thicker than the after stack. The 12-pounder guns were mounted slightly further forward than in the Acorns.

Variation within the class
Fourteen of the class were completed to an Admiralty standard design, although those built by John Brown and Company at Clydebank (Hind, Hornet and Hydra) had Brown-Curtis type turbines and only two shafts.

Thornycroft specials
Acheron and Ariel were longer, had higher power (15,500 shp) and were faster, achieving  in trials.

Yarrow specials (or "special I class")
They were a little larger than the rest of the class and developed , but carried the same armament. Like the John Brown-built boats Hind, Hydra and Hornet, they had only 2 shafts, with steam developed in 2 Yarrow-type water-tube boilers and delivered to 2 Parsons turbines. Firedrake, Lurcher and Oak were distinctive in appearance and indeed much faster.

Conversion to minelayers
Ferret, Sandfly and Ariel were converted into fast minelaying destroyers in 1917, serving with the 20th Flotilla.  They were each capable of laying 40 mines.

Evaluation
This class of torpedo boat destroyers (TBDs, or colloquially, "boats") handled well and were excellent sea boats; like similar classes of TBDs of the time, they had open bridges but were much drier at sea than was the norm.

Ships

Builders' I class

Admiralty I class

Yarrow Specials (or "Special I class")

Australian River class

Notes

References

Bibliography
 Destroyers of the Royal Navy, 1893–1981, Maurice Cocker, 1983, Ian Allan 
 The British Destroyer by Captain T D Manning CBE VRD RNVR (Ret'd), (Putnam, 1961)
 Conway's All the World's Fighting Ships 1906–1921, Conway Maritime Press, 1985, Robert Gardiner 

 
Destroyer classes
Ship classes of the Royal Navy